There are 8 school districts in the province of Nova Scotia, Canada.

Current school districts

Historical enrollment by district

References

External links
Nova Scotia Department of Education - School Districts

School districts
Nova Scotia, school districts
Education in Nova Scotia